The Perger-Verzeichnis ("Perger‘s Catalogue") is a thematic-chronological catalogue of instrumental compositions by Michael Haydn, compiled by Lothar Perger in 1907. Like Ludwig von Köchel's catalog of Mozart's compositions (the Köchel-Verzeichnis), Perger's catalog uses a single range of numbers, from 1 to 136, but like Hoboken's catalog of Joseph Haydn's music, groups the pieces first into categories (symphonies, concertos, etc.) and then sorts them chronologically.

Perger's attempt at figuring out the chronology is, however, so full of mistakes (including the attribution to Haydn of music by others) that later musicologists, instead of trying to amend the catalog (as they have with Köchel's) have created new ones from scratch. The most credible is the one by Charles Sherman and T. Donley Thomas, a chronological catalog of 838 pieces in which each piece is assigned an MH number in that range according to their best guesses at chronology.

Even so, Perger's catalog is still widely used by libraries, music publishing houses and some record companies.

For a more complete listing of Michael Haydn's instrumental and vocal music, see list of compositions by Michael Haydn. The following list only includes those pieces with a Perger number, even when they're not by Haydn. See also Klafsky-Verzeichnis.

Symphonies 

Perger numbered the symphonies from 1 to 52, but he included suites from incidental music by Haydn compiled into symphonies by someone else, as well as three symphonies altogether written by others. However, Perger overlooked a divertimento in G major that is sometimes called a symphony.

 Symphony No. 1C in E-flat major, MH 35, Perger 1 (1760)
 Symphony No. 2 in C major, MH 37, Perger 2 (1761)
 Symphony No. 5 in A major, MH 63, Perger 3 (1763)
 Symphony No. 6 in C major, MH 64, Perger 4 (1764)
 Symphony No. 7 in E major, MH 65, Perger 5 (1764)
 Symphony No. 16 in A major, MH 152, Perger 6 (1771)
 Symphony No. 12 in G major, MH 108, Perger 7 (1768)
 Introduction to the cantata "Der gute Hirt", Perger 8 (1772)
 Symphony No. 11 in B-flat major, MH 82, Perger 9 (1766)
 Symphony No. 18 in C major, MH 188, Perger 10 (1773)
 Symphony No. 19 in D major, MH 198, Perger 11 (1774)
 Symphony No. 20 in C major, MH 252, Perger 12 (1777)
 Incidental music from Zaïre, MH 255, Perger 13 (1777)
 Symphony No. 22 in F major, MH 284, Perger 14, Sherman 23
 Symphony No. 24 in A major, MH 302, Perger 15
 Symphony No. 25 in G major, MH 334, Perger 16, K. 444 (1783)
 Symphony No. 26 in E-flat major, MH 340, Perger 17 (1783)
 Symphony No. 27 in B-flat major, Opus 1 No. 2, Perger 18, MH 358
 Symphony No. 28 in C major, Opus 1 No. 3, Perger 19, MH 384
 Symphony No. 29 in D minor, MH 393, Perger 20 (1784)
 Symphony No. 30 in D major, MH 399, Perger 21 (1785)
 Symphony No. 31 in F major, MH 405, Perger 22 (1785)
 Symphony No. 32 in D major, MH 420, Perger 23 (1786)
 Symphony No. 33 in B-flat major, MH 425, Perger 24, without the Minuet (which is Perger 82) (1786)
 Sinfonia from Andromeda e Perseo, MH 438, Perger 25 (1787)
 Symphony No. 34 in E-flat major, MH 473, Perger 26 (1788)
 Symphony No. 35 in G major, MH 474, Perger 27 (1788)
 Symphony No. 36 in B-flat major, MH 475, Perger 28 (1788)
 Symphony No. 37 in D major, MH 476, Perger 29 (1788)
 Symphony No. 38 in F major, MH 477, Perger 30 (1788)
 Symphony No. 39 in C major, MH 478, Perger 31 (1788)
 Symphony No. 40 in F major, MH 507, Perger 32 (1789)
 Symphony No. 41 in A major, MH 508, Perger 33 (1789)
 Concerto for trumpet and trombone, MH 60/61, Perger 34 (1763)
 Symphony No. 1 in C major, MH 23, Perger 35 (1758?)
 Symphony No. 9 in D major, MH 50, Perger 36 (1760?)
 Symphony No. 13 in D major, MH 132, Perger 37 (1768?)
 Symphony No. 8 in D major, MH 69, Perger 38 (1764)
 A symphony by someone else, Perger 39
 A symphony by someone else, Perger 40
 Symphony No. 15 in D major, MH 150, Perger 41 (1771)
 Symphony No. 21 in D major, MH 272, Perger 42 (1778)
 Symphony No. 23 in D major, MH 287, Perger 43, Sherman 22
 Symphony No. 17 in E major, MH 151, Perger 44 (1771?)
 Symphony No. 10 in F major, MH 51, Perger 45 (1764?)
 Suite from Die Wahrheit der Natur, MH 118, Perger 46 (1769?), sometimes called a symphony in F major
 Suite from Rebekka als Braut, MH 76, Perger 47 (1766)
 A symphony by someone else, Perger 48
 A symphony by someone else, Perger 49
 A symphony by Georg Christoph Wagenseil, Perger 50
 Symphony No. 4 in B-flat major, MH  62, Perger 51 (1763)
 Symphony No. 14 in B flat major, MH 133, Perger 52 (1771)

Concertos 

Perger overlooked a violin concerto in G major, MH 52, while the horn concerto he placed in a miscellaneous category at the end.

 Violin Concerto in B-flat major, MH 36, Perger 53
 Flute Concerto No. 1 in D major, MH 81, Perger 54
 Concerto in C major for Organ and Viola, MH 41, Perger 55
 Flute Concerto No. 2 in D major, MH 105, Perger 56
 Harpsichord Concerto in F major (fragment), MH 268, Perger 57

Marches

 March in D major, Perger 58, MH 67
 March in F major, Perger 59, MH 421
 March in D major, Perger 60, MH 439
 March in C major, Perger 61, MH 440
 March in D major, Perger 62, MH 441
 March in D major, Perger 63, MH 339
 March in D major, Perger 64, MH 515
 Marcia Turchese in C major, Perger 65, MH 601
 March in C major, Perger 66, MH 823
 National-Marsch in C major, Perger 67 (lost), MH 569
 March in D major, Perger 68, MH 220

Minuets 

For the most part these are collections of minuets that can be played on their own. Because Haydn wrote a minuet to symphony No. 33 long after the rest of the symphony, Perger mixed this minuet up with the free-standing pieces.

 6 Menuetti, Perger 69, MH 333
 6 Menuetti, Perger 70, MH 354
 6 Menuetti, Perger 71, MH 414
 6 Menuettini Tedeschi, Perger 72, MH 416
 6 Menuetti, Perger 73, MH 423
 6 Menuettini Tedeschi, Perger 74, MH 424
 6 Menuetti, Perger 75, MH 499
 6 Menuettini Tedeschi, Perger 76, MH 417
 12 Menuetti, Perger 77, MH 550
 12 Menuetti, Perger 78, MH 693
 12 Menuetti, Perger 79, MH 135
 12 Menuetti, Perger 80, MH 274
 12 Menuetti, Perger 81, MH 193
 Menuetto for symphony No. 33 in B flat major, MH 652, Perger 82

Inglese 

 2 Inglese in C major, Perger 83, MH 529

Ballo 

 Ballet-Pantomime "Herman", Perger 84

Serenades 

 Serenade in D major, Perger 85, MH 407
 A serenade by someone else, Perger 86
 Serenade in D major, Perger 87, MH 86
 A serenade by someone else, Perger 88

Cassations 

 Cassation in D major, Perger 89, MH 171
 Cassation in E flat major, Perger 90, MH 208

Pastorello 

 Pastorello in C major, Perger 91, MH 83

Divertimenti 

 Divertimento in B flat major, Perger 92, MH 199
 Divertimento in D major, Perger 93, MH 319, includes a march in D major, MH 320
 Divertimento in G major, Perger 94, MH 406
 Divertimento in D major, Perger 95, MH 418
 Divertimento in G major, Perger 96, MH 518

Nocturnes 

Though Perger called them nocturnes, some of these are more generally known as divertimenti. The list even includes a string quartet and a quintet.

 Divertimento in C major, Perger 97 (lost), MH A8
 Divertimento à 3 in C major, Perger 98, MH 179
 Divertimento à 3 in C major, Perger 99, MH 27
 Divertimento in D major, Perger 100, MH 464
 Divertimento à 3 in D major, Perger 101, MH  5
 Divertimento à 3 in E flat major, Perger 102, MH  9
 Divertimento à 3 in G major, Perger 103, MH  6
 String Quartet in G major, Perger 104, MH 172
 String Quintet in B flat major, Perger 105, MH 412
 Notturno in F major, Perger 106, MH 185

Partita 

 Partita in F major, Perger 107 (lost), MH 59

Quintets

 String Quintet in C major, Perger 108, MH 187
 String Quintet in G major, Perger 109, MH 189
 String Quintet in F major, Perger 110, MH 367
 String Quintet in E flat major, Perger 111, MH 516
 String Quintet in F major, Perger 112, MH 411
 A quintet by someone else, Perger 113
 A quintet by someone else, Perger 114

Quartets

 Quartetto for violin, English horn, cello & continuo in C major, Perger 115, MH 600
 String Quartet in C major, Perger 116, MH 313
 Flute Quartet in D major, P 117, P 117
 String Quartet in E flat major, Perger 118, MH 309
 String Quartet in F major, Perger 119, MH 312
 Flute Quartet in F major, P deest, P deest
 Piece for string quartet in G major, MH 664
 String Quartet in G minor, Perger 120, MH 311
 String Quartet in A major, Perger 121, MH 299
 String Quartet in A major, Perger 122, MH 310
 String Quartet in B flat major, Perger 123, MH 209
 String Quartet in B flat major, Perger 124, MH 308
 String Quartet in B flat major, Perger 125, MH 316

Sonatas

Hieronymus Graf von Colloredo commissioned Haydn to write six duos for violin and viola. Haydn fell ill after completing the fourth, so he asked Mozart to write the other two (K. 423 and K. 424). The set of six was presented as all Haydn's, and Colloredo was unable to "detect in them Mozart's obvious workmanship." With these Perger lumped a sonata for two violins and organ.

 Sonata for 2 violins & organ in B flat major, Perger 126 (lost), MH Appendix 9
 Duo for violin and viola in C major, Perger 127, MH 335
 Duo for violin and viola in D major, Perger 128, MH 336
 Duo for violin and viola in E major, Perger 129, MH 337
 Duo for violin and viola in F major, Perger 130, MH 338

Preludes

 Cadenze e versetti, Perger 131, MH 176

Miscellaneous and fragments

 Der Traum, Perger 133, MH 84
 Horn Concerto in D major, Perger 134, MH 134
 String Quartet in G major, Perger 135 (fragment), MH 174
 Andantino for string quartet in B flat major, Perger 136, MH 175

Notes

References
 Charles H. Sherman and T. Donley Thomas, Johann Michael Haydn (1737 - 1806), a chronological thematic catalogue of his works. Stuyvesant, New York: Pendragon Press (1993)
 C. Sherman, "Johann Michael Haydn" in The Symphony: Salzburg, Part 2 London: Garland Publishing (1982): lxiii

Classical music catalogues